Munnozia pinnatipartita is a species of flowering plant in the family Asteraceae. It is found only in Ecuador. Its natural habitats are subtropical or tropical moist lowland forests and subtropical or tropical moist montane forests. It is threatened by habitat loss.

References

pinnatipartita
Endemic flora of Ecuador
Near threatened plants
Vulnerable flora of South America
Taxonomy articles created by Polbot